The Sailors and Soldiers (Gifts for Land Settlement) Act 1916 was an act of the Parliament of the United Kingdom.  It allowed for the donation of land to public bodies for the settlement and employment of former servicemen.  The catalyst for the act was a proposed donation of land near Bosbury, Herefordshire, to the Board of Agriculture and Fisheries by Robert Buchanan, following the death of his son in the First World War.

The act was proposed by the Asquith coalition ministry in November 1916 and received royal assent under the Lloyd George ministry in December. This land, the Bosbury Trust Estate, was the only land ever donated under the act. It remains in use, administered by a charitable trust for the housing and employment of military veterans.

The Sailors and Soldiers (Gifts for Land Settlement) Act 1916 was proposed for repeal by the Law Commission and Scottish Law Commission in January 2008.  It was repealed by the Statute Law (Repeals) Act 2008 on 21 July 2008.

Description 
In 1916, following the death of his son Alan at the Battle of Bellewaarde on 16 June 1915, Robert Buchanan proposed gifting land near the village of Bosbury, Herefordshire, to the nation for the settlement of servicemen returned from war.  The Board of Agriculture and Fisheries was unsure whether it had the ability under existing law to accept the gift.

To provide a basis in law for the acceptance by the board and local authorities of gifts of land for the purpose of providing employment for ex-servicemen, the Asquith coalition ministry proposed the Sailors and Soldiers (Gifts for Land Settlement) Bill to the House of Commons on 23 November 1916.  It received a second reading on 28 November and was passed, unamended, in the House of Lords by 19 December (by this time Asquith's government had been replaced by that of Lloyd George).  The act received royal assent on 22 December 1916.

Land gifted under the act was held by the public body it was gifted to, who also acted as trustee for any charitable trust formed. It was intended that land acquired under the act would be used to provide employment for ex-servicemen, partially countering an expected glut of labour when conscripted servicemen were demobilised at the end of the war and also increasing agricultural outputs.

Bosbury Trust Estate 

The only land ever donated under the act was Buchanan's. It was administered through a charitable trust, known as the Buchanan Trust.

The estate was administered as a collection of smallholdings.  The 1967 United Kingdom foot-and-mouth outbreak badly affected stock on the estate and in the aftermath the trust was reorganised under a Charity Commission scheme.  The Board's successor, the Ministry of Agriculture, Fisheries and Food, remained trustee until 1998 when it was transferred to Herefordshire Council.  Following a recommendation by the Charity Commission the trusteeship was transferred to a new body, the Buchanan Trustee Company Ltd., in May 2016.  The trust has moved towards providing more accommodation on the estate, with an aim of eventually providing 20–40 almshouses to military veterans.

Repeal 
The act was recommended for repeal by the eighteenth report on statute law repeals published by the Law Commission and the Scottish Law Commission in January 2008.  They argued that no public body would today be willing to accept land gifted with a restriction that it could only be used for the employment of veterans and  that changes in farming practices had reduced the number of people that could be supported on land.  The act was repealed by the Brown ministry under the Statute Law (Repeals) Act 2008 on 21 July, though that act included a provision that the repeal did not affect any gifts previously made under the 1916 act.

References 

United Kingdom Acts of Parliament 1916
Repealed United Kingdom Acts of Parliament